Cornel Dinu (born 9 June 1989) is a Romanian professional footballer who plays as a defender for Liga I club Chindia Târgoviște. Born in Dobra, 25 km away from Târgoviște, Dinu played all its career for local teams, FCM Târgoviște and Chindia Târgoviște.

Honours
Chindia Târgoviște
 Liga III: 2014–15
 Liga II: 2018–19

References

External links
 
 
 

1989 births
Living people
People from Dâmbovița County
Romanian footballers
Association football defenders
Liga I players
Liga II players
Liga III players
FCM Târgoviște players
AFC Chindia Târgoviște players